Robert Gilmour LeTourneau (November 30, 1888 – June 1, 1969), born in Richford, Vermont, he was a prolific inventor of earthmoving machinery and the founder of LeTourneau Technologies, Inc. His factories supplied LeTourneau machines which represented nearly 70 percent of the earthmoving equipment and engineering vehicles used by the Allied forces during World War II, and more than half of the  Alcan Highway in Canada was built with LeTourneau equipment. Over the course of his life he secured nearly 300 patents relating to earthmoving equipment, manufacturing processes and machine tools.

Contributions
The LeTourneau name became synonymous with earthmoving worldwide. LeTourneau was largely responsible for the invention and development of many types of earthmoving machines now widely used. He designed and built machines using technology that was years, sometimes decades, ahead of its time and became recognized worldwide as a leader in the development and manufacture of heavy equipment.

LeTourneau’s ingenuity is credited with: the use of rubber tires in earthmoving; numerous improvements relating to scrapers; the development of low-pressure, heavy-duty rubber tires; the two-wheeled tractor unit ("Tournapull"); electric wheel drive; and mobile offshore drilling platforms.

With the help of his wife, the late Evelyn Peterson (1900-1987), he founded LeTourneau University, a private, Christian institution, in Longview, Texas. LeTourneau was widely known as a devout Christian and generous philanthropist to Christian causes, including the "LeTourneau Christian Center" camp and conference grounds in Rushville, New York and Georgia Baptist Conference Center in Toccoa, Georgia. LeTourneau was often referred to by his contemporaries as "God's businessman".

Early life
Robert LeTourneau left school in 1902, at the age of fourteen. He moved from Vermont to Duluth, Minnesota, then to Portland, Oregon, where he began to work as an apprentice ironmonger at the East Portland Iron Works. While learning the foundry and machinist trades, he studied mechanics from an International Correspondence Schools course that had been given to him, though he never completed any course assignments. He later moved to San Francisco, where he worked at the Moore and Scott Iron Works at the personal invitation of the owner. After the San Francisco earthquake and fire, work was hard to come by. He worked at the Yerba Buena Power Plant and learned welding, and became familiar with the application of electricity. During this time, LeTourneau worked at a number of jobs including woodcutter, bricklayer, farmhand, miner, and carpenter’s laborer, acquiring knowledge of the manual trades that proved valuable in later life.

In 1909 he took an automobile correspondence course granting himself a "Bachelor of Motorcycles" as he learned about vehicle mechanics and graduated by taking apart and putting back together his newly acquired motorcycle in a day. After working on a project to build a bridge across the Stanislaus River, and seeing first hand the Fresno scraper, he was anxious to put to use his mechanical skills. In 1911, LeTourneau started the Superior Garage, in Stockton, as half-owner putting up $1,000 and building what may have been the first building designed exclusively for the sales and servicing of cars in that section of California. In 1917, he married Evelyn Peterson, the daughter of a  company owner from Minnesota.

LeTourneau refused military service because of permanent neck injuries sustained in a car-racing accident. During World War I, he worked as a maintenance assistant at the Mare Island Naval Shipyard, in Vallejo, California, where he was trained as an electrical machinist and improved his welding skills.  After the war, LeTourneau returned to Stockton and discovered the Superior Garage business had failed. To repay his portion of the debts, he took a job repairing a Holt Manufacturing Company crawler-tractor and was then employed by the tractor owner to level  using the tractor and a towed scraper.

Move into manufacturing

This type of work appealed to LeTourneau, and in January 1920 he purchased a used Holt tractor and, with a hired scraper, began business as a regrading contractor. In May 1921, he purchased a plot of land in Stockton and established an engineering workshop, where he designed and built several types of scrapers. Combining contracting and earthmoving equipment manufacturing, his business expanded and in 1929 incorporated in California as "R.G. LeTourneau, Inc."

LeTourneau completed many earthmoving projects during the 1920s and early 1930s, including the Boulder Highway to Hoover Dam, in Nevada, the Marysville Levees, Orange County Dam and the Newhall Cut-off, in California. In 1933, LeTourneau retired from contracting to devote his attention to the manufacturing of earthmoving equipment. In 1935, he built a manufacturing plant in Peoria, Illinois, and the continued expansion of his business saw the establishment of manufacturing plants in Toccoa, Georgia, in 1938, in Rydalmere, New South Wales, Australia, in 1941, in Vicksburg, Mississippi, in 1942, and in Longview, Texas in 1945.

In 1953, LeTourneau sold his entire earthmoving equipment line to the Westinghouse Air Brake Company for $30 million. It was later sold around to Marathon Manufacturing Company in 1972, to Rowan in 1994, and to Joy Global in 2011 which was acquired by and renamed to Komatsu Mining Corp. He then applied his ingenuity to the development of the electric wheel drive concept. In 1958, at the age of seventy, LeTourneau re-entered the earthmoving equipment manufacturing business, offering contractors a range of high capacity earthmoving, transportation, and material handling machines based on the revolutionary electric wheel drive system he had developed. An electric wheel drive is also called an electric wheel hub motor.

Later career
In 1965, I.C.S. awarded LeTourneau his diploma in engineering, 50 years after he studied the course. LeTourneau was 76 at the time and, in accepting the diploma, jovially remarked to executive assistant, Nels Stjernstrom: "So now I've got a diploma. Now I'm educated."

In 1966, at age 77, LeTourneau handed over presidency of his company, LeTourneau Technologies, to his son, Richard. LeTourneau continued to work each day and could be found at the drawing board in his modest office, designing new ways to move larger loads faster and more economically.

Personal pursuits

LeTourneau held many respected positions throughout his life as a Christian layman, including as a leader in the Christian & Missionary Alliance Church, president of the Christian Business Men's Committee (CBMC) and president of the Gideons International. For 30 years he flew thousands of miles each week to maintain Christian speaking engagements around the United States and overseas. 

LeTourneau set aside 90 percent of his salary and company profits for religious donations, living on the other 10 percent. "You have made the word of God a glorious, practical reality," radio program host Robert Ripley told LeTourneau, then turned to the audience with his own trademark flourish. "And of such is the work of faith... believe it or not."

LeTourneau was a firm believer in the effectiveness of practical instruction combined with classroom studies; and, in 1946, he purchased an unused military hospital, accompanying land and buildings in Longview. There he established the LeTourneau Technical Institute at the site of the former Harmon General Hospital to provide sound technical and mechanical training, traditional college courses, and training for missionary technicians, based on the philosophy of combining work, education, and Christian testimony. The LeTourneau Technical Institute became a college in its own right, in 1961, and eventually gained "university" status to become LeTourneau University.

In 1953, LeTourneau began a development project in the country of Liberia, West Africa, with the diverse goals of colonization, land development, agricultural development, livestock introduction, evangelism and philanthropic activities. In 1954, a colonization project with similar objectives to those in Liberia was established in the country of Peru, South America. The project in Peru was called "Tournavista".

Stroke and death

In March 1969, LeTourneau suffered a severe stroke from which he never recovered. He died on June 1, 1969, at the age of eighty. Besides his wife, Evelyn, LeTourneau was outlived by four sons, Richard, Roy, Ted, and Ben, and a daughter, Louise Dick.

Legacy and awards
Known throughout the construction world as, "The Dean of Earthmoving," LeTourneau is considered to this day to have been the world's greatest inventor of earthmoving and materials handling equipment. Few manufacturers of that era had such a profound effect upon the art of earthmoving as did LeTourneau. Just two years prior to his death, LeTourneau recorded his thoughts about the future of earthmoving equipment: "Within the next few years construction machinery will grow bigger and bigger, and more and more powerful. Instead of 'tons' of capacity, they’ll all be in 'hundreds of tons' and instead of hundreds of horsepower, they’ll all be rated in 'thousands' of horsepower. We’re already seeing it in big hauling units in the mines, and believe me, when the contractor and mining companies start looking for bigger and more profitable hauling units and earthmoving equipment, I’m going to be right there, the firstest with the mostest."

LeTourneau was active in his company as president and chairman of the board from 1929 until 1966. He also held the position of chief engineer, personally working alongside his engineers and employees throughout his working life. Having spent his entire life around earthmoving equipment, LeTourneau was just as likely to be seen at the controls of one of his machines, as he was to be seen attending to corporate matters. It was well known that he preferred the former. LeTourneau shunned the high-life often associated with successful businessmen, preferring to spend his time at the drawing board with the engineers designing new machinery or spending time on the factory floor overseeing his employees.

LeTourneau Hall at Toccoa Falls College was named in his honor. Toccoa Airport, also known as R. G. LeTourneau Field, was built by LeTourneau and named in his honor.

Throughout his career, he was the recipient of more than 30 awards and honors related to engineering, manufacturing, and the development of heavy equipment. In 1936, he was presented with the "Appreciation of Service Achievement 1931-1935," by Six Companies Incorporated for supplying earthmoving equipment to the "Boulder Dam" project. He was awarded the Frank P. Brown Medal in 1956. Recognition of service to the earthmoving industry later came from many other contractors in the industry, and, in February 1958, LeTourneau was presented with the "Beavers Award" at the third-annual awards dinner of the Beavers, an association of leaders in the heavy construction industry. In presenting the award to LeTourneau, Beaver president George H. Atkinson, of the highly respected U.S. contractors, Guy F. Atkinson Company, of San Francisco, said, "There is hardly any place in the vast industry that has not benefited through the products of Mr. LeTourneau's inventive genius."

See also
LeTourneau University

References

Bibliography
 LeTourneau, R.G.  Mover of Men and Mountains, Autobiography  (Prentice-Hall 1960, 1967; Reprint Moody Press 1967, 1972),  
" The LeTourneau Legend", Equipment history,  (Global General Publishing Pty Ltd; 1995, 1998, 3rd revised edition 2007)
" The LeTourneau Archive", Equipment history,  (Global General Publishing Pty Ltd; 2005)
" WABCO Australia", LeTourneau Australia history,  (Global General Publishing Pty Ltd; 2007)
" The WABCO Archive Wheel-Tractor Scrapers", Letourneau-Westinghouse scraper history,  (Global General Publishing Pty Ltd; 2011)

External links 

 Road Building Machinery, Stephens Co. At plant of L.G. LeTourneau, near Toccoa, Georgia, May 1940. From College of Agriculture and Environmental Sciences (CAES) Photograph Collection, University Archives, Hargrett Library, University of Georgia, Athens, Georgia. Web. 4 June 2016.
 Road Building Machinery, Stephens Co. At plant of L.G. LeTourneau, near Toccoa, Georgia, May 1940. From College of Agriculture and Environmental Sciences (CAES) Photograph Collection, University Archives, Hargrett Library, University of Georgia, Athens, Georgia. Web. 4 June 2016.
 

1888 births
1969 deaths
People from Franklin County, Vermont
People from Toccoa, Georgia
American Christians
American evangelicals
Members of the Christian and Missionary Alliance
American manufacturing businesspeople
American philanthropists
People from Longview, Texas
University and college founders
LeTourneau University
20th-century American inventors
Inventors from Vermont